Charles Verlinden (3 February 1907 – 19 May 1996) was a Belgian medievalist with a particular interest in the history of slavery in Europe. In 1970 he was awarded by the Premio Internazionale Galileo Galilei dei Rotary Italiani for his contribution in Italian history.

Publications
 Les Empereurs Belges de Constantinople (Brussels, Charles Dessart, 1945)
 L'esclavage dans l'Europe médiévale (2 volumes, Bruges, 1955; Ghent, 1977)

References

1907 births
1996 deaths
Belgian medievalists
Ghent University alumni
École pratique des hautes études alumni
Academic staff of Ghent University
University of Paris alumni
Members of the Lincean Academy
Members of the Real Academia de la Historia